The Mt. Prospect Methodist Church was designed by John Pickering in a Greek Revival style and was built in 1886.  It was listed on the National Register of Historic Places in 1990.

It has been viewed as "the finest example in the local area of a vernacular Greek Revival church design."

Mount Prospect Methodist Church. Arkansas Department of
Heritage. 30 September 1999. Mount Prospect at Arkansas dept.

References

External links
Mt. Prospect Methodist Church, website with photo of church

Churches on the National Register of Historic Places in Arkansas
Churches completed in 1886
19th-century Methodist church buildings in the United States
National Register of Historic Places in Columbia County, Arkansas
Greek Revival church buildings in Arkansas
1886 establishments in Arkansas
Episcopal church buildings in Arkansas
Methodist churches in Arkansas